Stephen Peter Munisteri (born December 25, 1957) is an American attorney who served as the chairman of the Republican Party of Texas from 2010 to 2015.    
In 2017, Munisteri was appointed to the White House staff as deputy assistant to the president and principal deputy director of the Office of Public Liaison.

Munisteri was elected chairman at the state convention held in Dallas on June 13, 2010, when he unseated Cathie Adams, the wife of a Dallas chiropractor, who had held the position for only eight months. He is the first challenger in modern Texas Republican history to defeat a sitting incumbent for the position of state chairman. Early in his political career, Munisteri served as state chairman of the Texas Chapter of Young Americans for Freedom and founded the Young Conservatives of Texas (YCT) in 1980.

Munisteri stepped down as party chairman to join U.S. Senator Rand Paul of Kentucky as a senior advisor to Paul's 2016 presidential campaign.

Background
Munisteri received a Bachelor of Business Administration degree from the University of Texas at Austin and a Doctor of Jurisprudence from the UT Law School, completing both degrees in five, instead of seven, years. With his degrees in hand, Munisteri returned to Houston and worked at the law offices of Funderburk and Funderburk (now Funderburk Funderburk Courtois, L.L.P.) for fourteen months before deciding to open his solo law practice, which he continued in partnership with others, for twenty-seven years. Munisteri founded the firm on November 1, 1982, the day before the defeat of Bill Clements as the first Republican governor of Texas since 1873. The firm is now known as Sprott, Rigby, Newson, Robbins & Lunceford, P.C.

In addition to his legal practice, Munisteri was also involved in numerous other businesses in his professional career. He founded Munisteri Properties, a company with interests in commercial properties and whose primary asset was a Greenway Plaza-area building built in 1961 by Gerald D. Hines, which Munisteri redeveloped in 1993. Munisteri sold the Greenway Plaza Area building in 2007. However he still owns an interest in two shopping centers and a commercial building, as well as residential property. He also founded Munisteri Exploration in 1989, and has participated as a partner in the drilling of 60 oil and natural gas wells through 2014. As a side business, Munisteri managed dozens of professional boxers from 1989 to 2009, when he fully retired from the business.

Early political involvement

Munisteri was active in politics early in his teenage years, first working as a volunteer for the campaigns of Texas Republicans Hank Grover and John Tower in 1972, though the two were bitter intraparty rivals. Munisteri then formed a conservative club at Memorial High School in Houston. In 1976, he was elected State Vice Chairman for Texas Young Americans for Freedom, was an active volunteer for Ronald Reagan and attended the Republican National Convention.  From 1977 to 1980, he served as state chairman for YAF and was also elected to YAF's national board of directors. In 1977, Texas YAF was named the most improved state organization at its 1977 national convention.  Under Munisteri's chairmanship, YAF began the practice of issuing legislative rankings for members of the Texas House of Representatives.

In 1980, after experiencing dissatisfaction with the top-down leadership of the national YAF organization at its February 1980 convention, Munisteri proposed a new Texas-based conservative organization to the Texas YAF board.  The board voted unanimously to create a new organization named Young Conservatives of Texas.  The organization was founded on Texas Independence Day, March 2, 1980, at the Driskill Hotel in Austin, Texas.  Munisteri served as the first state chairman.

Munisteri served as state chairman of Young Texans for Reagan in 1980 under Reagan Texas Chair Ernie Angelo. He continued his Republican Party (GOP) activism as a precinct chairman of precincts 213 and 133 in Harris County in the 1980s, and was also elected to the State Republican Executive Committee for Senate District 17. Munisteri has worked in over 50 campaigns in a volunteer capacity. In 1995, he worked for the Lamar Alexander presidential campaign and helped to put together the Texas volunteer organization under Alexander's state chair Robert Mosbacher Jr. He also traveled to New Hampshire, Iowa, Florida and South Carolina on behalf of the Alexander campaign in 1996. In 1999, Munisteri spent a month in Iowa to assist the George W. Bush presidential campaign in the Iowa straw poll, and then spent a month in California running a Bush campaign office in San Fernando. In 2004, Munisteri was part of the Bush legal response team in Ohio during that year's presidential race. In 2008, he traveled to Iowa to assist Texas Land Commissioner Jerry E. Patterson in supporting Fred Thompson for president. That same year, Munisteri went on to South Carolina to volunteer on behalf of Thompson, and then later spent two months in Iowa assisting John McCain Iowa director Charlie Liebschutz.

Texas GOP chairman

2009–2011

In September 2009, Texas GOP State Chairman Tina Benkiser announced her resignation at the quarterly State Republican Executive Committee meeting in Austin. Under Texas law, each major party must at all times have a woman as either its chairman or vice-chairman.  Since Vice-chairman Robin Armstrong did not relinquish his position to seek to succeed Benkiser as state chairman, only a woman could be elected to fill the position.  On October 24, 2009, the SREC elected Texas GOP National Committeewoman Cathie Adams as Benkiser's successor by a vote of 36–25.

On January 22, 2010, Munisteri announced his candidacy for state chairman, citing a desire to make the RPT a "more effective organization" by utilizing his "strong business administrative skills". He was the second declared challenger in the race, as former SREC member Tom Mechler of Amarillo, had announced his candidacy the previous summer. Munisteri's election marked the first time in modern history that a challenger defeated a sitting incumbent at the state convention. When Munisteri stepped down early in 2015, Mechler was elected his successor on the third secret ballot by the 62-member Republican State Executive Committee.

On the second day of the convention, delegates voted by senatorial district for the position of State Chairman.  Munisteri won 13 districts, Adams won 12 districts, and Mechler won 6 districts.  Since no candidate received a majority of districts, a vote was held in the nominations committee of the convention, and Munisteri won the second ballot by a count of 22–9.  After the nominations committee presented their results to the full convention, Adams then proceeded to force an unprecedented floor vote for the position, at which point Tom Mechler officially endorsed Munisteri's candidacy.  Munisteri then addressed the full convention and declared that his differences with Adams are "insignificant to the duty we have to our country." He placed the reelection of Perry as top priority and then the regaining of Republican majorities in the U.S. House of Representatives and the U.S. Senate. He added, "there's no question we have to get rid of that man in the White House," a reference to U.S. President Barack Obama. In the ensuing floor vote, Munisteri prevailed with a margin of 4,170 to 2,950 for Adams.

Munisteri has issued a monthly "Chairman's Update" email to Texas Republicans with information regarding his activities as chairman.  In December 2010, Munisteri announced that the RPT had fully retired its crippling debt and would end 2010 with zero debt, all bills paid, a record net worth, and a record positive cash balance in its accounts.

Under Munisteri's chairmanship in the 2010 general election, the Republican Party of Texas had a net gain of 324 Republican elected offices, obtained a super majority in the Texas House of Representatives, and won all statewide races on the ballot. In December 2011, Munisteri announced that for the first time in a decade, the state party had successfully recruited Republican county chairmen for the 2012 election cycle in all 254 Texas counties. In 2012, Munisteri served as a Presidential Elector for Mitt Romney and Paul Ryan.

2012–2013
Munisteri was reelected as state chairman in June 2012. Out of the over 9,000 delegates registered at the time of the 2012 convention vote, only one voted against him. The party has continued to be debt free since December 2010 and has now adopted a policy to pay down all invoices to $0 by the end of each calendar month. The party has also maintained cash reserves of at least $500,000 since November 2010. During the first three years of Munisteri's Chairmanship the party has brought in approximately $13.5 million including approximately $6.7 million in 2012 alone.

The party's improved financial condition allowed the RPT to be a major player in the 2010 and 2012 elections. This included, among other things, organizing three weekends of statewide block walk operations. This resulted in the Republican Party candidates winning 500 more offices in 2010 compared to 2008. Moreover, 75 additional office holders switched parties in 2010 for a net gain of 575 between the 2008 and 2010 election cycles. In 2012, the state party exclusively ran the Victory operations for the first time in years, resulting in the party making 2.6 million calls and sending out over 3 million pieces of mail. The state party spent a total of $2.2 million on its election efforts in 2012. Today there are currently 853 more Republicans in elected office than at the end of the elections in 2008.

Since his election, Munisteri has added a full-time youth director, outreach director, and political director. The party has also initiated an aggressive outreach program to the Hispanic, African American, and Asian American communities, which has resulted in a significant increase in the number of minority delegates to the state convention, a significant increase in the number of minority members of the SREC, and an increase in the number of minority Republican elected officials statewide. In 2012 the number of Hispanic Republican elected officials statewide increased from 58 to 78. In June 2013, Munisteri announced a partnership with the RNC to establish Victory Centers that will operate on a year-round basis and that the party would be hiring significant number of new field staff for these offices, including staffers assigned specifically to outreach to the Hispanic, African American, and Asian American communities.

2014
At the March 2014 meeting of the State Republican Executive Committee, Munisteri announced that he would seek re-election at the request of the successful Republican gubernatorial nominee Greg Abbott. Munisteri also reported at that meeting the party had brought in approximately $17 million in revenues during his tenure as chairman. He indicated that the party was in excellent financial health and has been completely debt free since November 2010. He also indicated that cash reserves had never fallen below $500,000 during that time. Munisteri also reported at that meeting that the outreach and Victory efforts continued to be expanded to include 10 full-time engagement and field staffers, include a full-time director of youth engagement, director of African American engagement, director of Hispanic engagement, and a full-time director of Asian American engagement.

The chairman reported on the great success of the Victory efforts. Specifically, he noted that the new statewide Asian American, African America, and Hispanic engagement organizations had been very active and attending numerous events around the state signing up hundreds of new contacts. Most encouraging, he also reported the engagement efforts has yielded verifiable results in the form of a February 2014 Gallup study that concluded that the Texas Republican Party had obtained 6% more support from the Hispanic community than the Republican Parties in all other 49 states. Moreover, the study indicated that Democrat support among Hispanics in Texas declined 7% over last few years. The chairman also reported that the RPT has opened permanent Victory centers in Fort Worth, Dallas, Austin, San Antonio, Houston, Corpus Christi, El Paso, and The Valley. These centers have overseen numerous block walks utilizing thousands of volunteers knocking on tens of thousands of doors.

In 2014, Munisteri was also an active member of the RNC's Commission on Convention Planning which presented its final report to the RNC in Memphis during the second week of May. Munisteri was also a member of the Rules Committee for the RNC and was appointed to a subcommittee that dealt with the Presidential Primary Process. He was an active supporter of reforming the process which included wrestling control of the debate process away from the media and giving it to the RNC. Munisteri also supported efforts to ensure that other states do not jump in front of Texas's March 1 primary date so Texas can be a major player in the 2016 presidential primary process.

At the 2014 State Convention, Munisteri was re-elected as chairman with only four votes against him out of approximately 7,000 delegates and alternates in attendance.

In November, Munisteri announced that the party had set a new record for the number of Republicans elected to office around the state. As of December 4, 2014, Republicans held 3,652 elected offices around the state. This represented an increase of 360. When Munisteri was elected to office, Republicans held 2,470 offices. Under his watch, the total increase in the number of Republicans who hold office around the state is 1,262.

The RPT also announced in November that under Munisteri's chairmanship, the party had brought in approximately $22 million and had reached the milestone of being completely debt-free for four consecutive years.

At the final quarterly meeting of the SREC, Munisteri announced that he had secured funding to maintain permanent Victory centers and staff across the state. This was the first time in the history of the party that victory operations did not cease at the conclusion of an election cycle.

2015–present 
In 2015, Munisteri announced he would be joining Senator Rand Paul's team of senior advisors. According to the Republican Party of Texas his resignation is effective March 7, 2015.  In an official statement explaining his reasoning behind the decision Munisteri writes: Today I informed the SREC that I will be stepping down on March 7th. I have done so, in part, in order to accept the position of Senior Advisor to Senator Rand Paul of Kentucky. Senator Paul shares my vision of promoting the conservative values of individual freedom, limited government, a strong national defense, and defense of the Constitution in each and every community in our country. 

Munisteri said he's supporting Paul, in part because of the Kentucky Republican's strategy to court nontraditional GOP voters, like African-Americans and young people.

On March 7, 2015, Munisteri presided over his last meeting of the SREC and provided a final report as to the condition of the party during his term. He also provided a more detailed report in writing to supporters of the party. He reported that he was turning over the chairmanship with $959,514 cash on hand plus $148,175 in pledges coming in. He reported that all liabilities were paid to $0. He also reported that during his tenure as chairman, the RPT collected $22,839,611 including $7,798,117 in 2014 alone. He reported that as of the date he was stepping down there were 3,660 Republican officeholders across the state, totaling approximately 67% of all offices in Texas. This represented a 1,190 Republican officeholder increase as compared to the time he took over the Chairmanship. He also noted that in 2008 the party had only held 45% of the offices across the state.

Munisteri also provided a summary of the party's Victory and field operations. He reported that during his tenure, the RPT sent out 10,201,811 pieces of mail and made 8,622,336 phone calls. In 2014, RPT volunteers also knocked on over half a million doors. He noted that during his term, Republicans set the record for the most number of Republicans in the State House at 102, tied the record for most number of State Senators at 20, and set the record for the most Republican Congressmen at 25. The day before he resigned, the RPT also announced, for the second time, that the party had successfully filled all 254 county chair seats.

Munisteri was an at-large delegate to the 2016 Republican National Convention from Texas. Munisteri was one of 48 delegates from Texas bound by state party rules to support Donald Trump at the convention. As of July 13, 2016, Trump had approximately 1,542 delegates. The winner of the Republican nomination needed the support of 1,237 delegates. Trump formally won the nomination on July 19, 2016, and  the Presidential election of 2016.

Beginning in 2017, Munisteri served as deputy assistant to the president and deputy director for the Office of Public Liaison in Trump Administration. He left the Trump Administration in 2019 to help run the 2020 re-election campaign of Texas senator John Cornyn.

In December 2020, Munisteri joined the office of Governor Greg Abbott as senior adviser and policy director.

References

External links

|-

1957 births
2012 United States presidential electors
American people of Italian descent
American Presbyterians
American sports businesspeople
Living people
Memorial High School (Hedwig Village, Texas) alumni
McCombs School of Business alumni
People from Houston
Texas lawyers
Texas Republican state chairmen
Texas Republicans
Trump administration personnel
University of Texas School of Law alumni